Henry Paul Riconda (March 17, 1897 in New York City – November 15, 1958 in Mahopac, New York), was a professional baseball player who played third base from 1923 to 1930.

Baseball career 
Prior to the 1923 Major League Baseball season, Riconda was purchased by the Philadelphia Athletics from the New Haven Profs for $5,000. On November 17, 1924, Riconda was traded with Chuck Rowland, Dennis Burns, Bob Hasty, Ed Sherling and $35,000 to the Portland Beavers of the Pacific Coast League for Mickey Cochrane. In October 1925, he was drafted by the Boston Braves in the 1925 Rule 5 draft. Riconda was traded with Frank Wilson to the Milwaukee Brewers of the American Association as part of a trade completed earlier for Lance Richbourg. In September 1927, Milwaukee traded Riconda to the Brooklyn Robins for Johnny Butler. In December 1928, Brooklyn traded Riconda along with Jesse Petty to the Pittsburgh Pirates for Glenn Wright. The Kansas City Monarchs of the American Association purchased his contract in June 1929. He was drafted in the Rule 5 Draft in 1929 by the Cincinnati Reds.

External links

1897 births
1958 deaths
Major League Baseball third basemen
Brooklyn Robins players
Cincinnati Reds players
Philadelphia Athletics players
Pittsburgh Pirates players
Boston Braves players
Baseball players from New York (state)
Springfield Ponies players
Springfield Green Sox players
New Haven Murlins players
New Haven Indians players
Portland Beavers players
Milwaukee Brewers (minor league) players
Kansas City Blues (baseball) players
Minneapolis Millers (baseball) players
Nashville Vols players
Montreal Royals players
Burials at Gate of Heaven Cemetery (Hawthorne, New York)